A partial list of synagogues in Canada:

Alberta

Calgary 
Beth Tzedec Congregation, Calgary, Alberta (Conservative)
Chabad Lubavitch of Alberta, Calgary, Alberta
House of Jacob, Calgary, Alberta (Modern Orthodox)
Kehilat Shalom, Calgary, Alberta
Temple Bnai Tikvah, Calgary, Alberta (Reform)

Edmonton 
Beth Israel Synagogue, Edmonton, Alberta
Beth Shalom Synagogue (Edmonton), Alberta
Beth Tzedek Congregation, Edmonton, Alberta
Chabad Lubavitch of Edmonton, Edmonton, Alberta
Temple Beth Ora Synagogue (Edmonton), Alberta (Reform)

Hanna 
Little Synagogue on the Prairie, Hanna, Alberta

British Columbia

Richmond 
Beth Tikvah Congregation, Richmond, BC
Chabad of Richmond, BC
Etz Chaim Congregation, Richmond, BC
Young Israel of Richmond, BC

Surrey 
Center for Judaism of Fraser Valley, Surrey, BC

Vancouver 
Ahavat Olam Congregation, Vancouver, BC
Chabad of Vancouver, BC
Congregation Beth Hamidrash, Vancouver, BC
Congregation Beth Israel, Vancouver, BC
Congregation Har El, Vancouver, BC
Congregation Beth Israel (Vancouver)
Congregation Schara Tzedeck (Vancouver)
Jewish Synagogue (1914), Melville Street, (Vancouver) designed by Hugh Braunton 
Lubavitch of British Columbia, Vancouver, BC
Or Shalom Synagogue, Vancouver, BC
Pacific Torah Institute, Vancouver, BC
Temple Sholom, Vancouver, BC (Reform)
The Ohel Ya'akov Community Kollel, Vancouver, BC

Victoria 
Aish Ha'Torah, Victoria, BC
Congregation Emanu-El (Victoria)
Kolot Mayim Temple, Victoria, BC (Reform)
Victoria Society for Humanistic Judaism, Victoria, BC

Manitoba

Winnipeg 
Adas Yeshurun Herzlia Congregation, Winnipeg, Manitoba
Ashkenazi Synagogue, Winnipeg, Manitoba
Chabad Lubavitch of Winnipeg, Manitoba
Chavurat Tefilah Fellowship of Prayer, Winnipeg, Manitoba
Chevra Mishnayes Synagogue, Winnipeg, Manitoba
Congregation Etz Chayim, Winnipeg, Manitoba
Congregation Shir Tikvah, Winnipeg, Manitoba (Dissolved) 
Shaarey Zedek Synagogue
Talmud Torah Beth Jacob Synagogue, Winnipeg, Manitoba
Temple Shalom, Winnipeg, Manitoba (Reform)

New Brunswick

Fredericton 
Sgoolai Israel Synagogue, Fredericton, New Brunswick

Moncton 
Tiferes Israel Synagogue, Moncton, New Brunswick

Saint John 

Shaarei Zedek Synagogue, Saint John, New Brunswick

Newfoundland and Labrador

St. John's 
Beth El Synagogue, St. John's, Newfoundland and Labrador
Chabad of Newfoundland, St. John's, Newfoundland and Labrador

Nova Scotia

Halifax 
Beth Israel Synagogue, Halifax, Nova Scotia
Shaar Shalom Synagogue, Halifax, Nova Scotia

Sydney 
Temple Sons of Israel Synagogue, Sydney, Nova Scotia

Ontario

Ajax 

 B'nai Shalom V'Tikvah (Reform)

Barrie 
Am Shalom Reform Congregation 
Chabad Jewish Centre of Barrie

Brampton 

 Har Tikvah Congregation (Reform)

Greater Toronto Area

Hamilton 
Adas Israel Synagogue, Hamilton, Ontario
Anshe Sholom Congregation, Hamilton, Ontario (Reform)
Beth Jacob Synagogue, Hamilton, Ontario
Chabad Lubavitch of Hamilton, Ontario

Kingston 
Beth Israel Congregation
Chabad Centre of Kingston
Congregation Iyr HaMelech, Kingston, Ontario (Reform)

Kitchener 

 Congregation Beth Jacob, Kitchener, Ontario

Niagara Falls 
Congregation Bnai Tikvah, Niagara Falls, Ontario

North Bay 
Sons of Jacob Congregation, North Bay, Ontario

London 
Beth Tefilah Synagogue, London, Ontario
Chabad House at University of Western Ontario, London, Ontario
Or Shalom Congregation, London, Ontario
Temple Israel of London, London, Ontario (Reform)

Ottawa 

Adath Shalom Congregation
Beit Tikvah of Ottawa
Chabad-Lubavitch of Ottawa
Chabad of Centrepointe
Chabad of Kanata
Finkelstein Chabad Jewish Centre
Glebe Shul
Kehillat Beth Israel
Congregation Machzikei Hadas
Or Haneshamah – Ottawa's Reconstructionist Community
Orthodox Community Ohev Yisroel
Ottawa Torah Center Chabad
Temple Israel Ottawa (Reform)
Young Israel of Ottawa

Owen Sound 
Beth Ezekiel Congregation, Owen Sound, Ontario

Peterborough 
 Beth Israel Synagogue (Peterborough, Ontario)

Sault Ste. Marie 
Congregation Beth Jacob, Sault Ste. Marie, Ontario

Saint Catharines 
 Congregation B'nai Israel (St. Catharines)

Sudbury 
Shaar Hashomayim Congregation, Sudbury, Ontario

Thunder Bay 
Shaarey Shomayim Congregation, Thunder Bay, Ontario

Waterloo 
Chabad of Waterloo
Temple Shalom, Waterloo, Ontario (Reform)

Whitby 
Chabad of Durham Region, Whitby, Ontario

Windsor 
Congregation Beth El, Windsor, Ontario (Reform)
Congregation Shaarey Zedek (Windsor, Ontario)
Congregation Shaar Hashomayim (Windsor, Ontario) (1928-9) Giles Boulevard East, designed by A. Stuart Allaster

Prince Edward Island

Charlottetown 
Prince Edward Island Jewish Community, Charlottetown, Prince Edward Island

Quebec

Boisbriand 
Kiryas Tosh, Boisbriand, Quebec

Côte-Saint-Luc 
Beth Chabad Cote St. Luc, Côte-Saint-Luc, Quebec
Beth Israel Beth Aaron Congregation, Côte-Saint-Luc, Quebec
Beth Zion Congregation Synagogue, Côte-Saint-Luc, Quebec
Congrégation Chouva Israël, Côte Saint-Luc, Québec
Congrégation Sepharade Or Hahayim, Côte-Saint-Luc, Quebec
Congregation Tifereth Beth David Jerusalem, Côte Saint-Luc, Quebec
Communauté Sépharade Beth Rambam, Côte Saint-Luc, Quebec

Dollard-des-Ormeaux 
Congregation Beth Tikvah, Dollard-des-Ormeaux, Quebec
Jewish Center Mazal Gutnick, Dollard-des-Ormeaux, Quebec
Synagogue Or Shalom, Dollard-des-Ormeaux, Quebec

Hampstead 
Adath Israel Poale Tzedek - Anshei Ozeroff Congregation, Hampstead, Quebec
Congregation Dorshei Emet, Hampstead, Quebec (Reconstructionist)
Montreal Torah Center - Bais Menachem Chabad Lubavitch

Montreal 

Bagg Street Shul
Chabad House Peel
Chabad NDG - Rohr Jewish Centre
Chabad of the Town Beit Ezra Community Center
Chabad Zichron Kedoshim
Congregation Machzikei Torah of Montreal
Congregation Maghen Abraham
Congrégation Sepharade Maghen-David
Congregation Shaare Zedek
Congregation Shomrim Laboker
Shaare Zion Congregation 
Young Israel of Montreal
Beit Hillel Congregation, Snowdon, Montreal, Quebec
Chevra Kadisha B'Nai Jacob Synagogue
Spanish and Portuguese Synagogue of Montreal
Chabad Ville Saint Laurent and Bois Franc
Congregation Beth Ora
Communauté Sépharade Hekhal Shalom, Saint Laurent, Quebec
Communauté Sepharade Petah Tikvah de Ville Saint Laurent
Nétivot Haïm
Congrégation Ahavath Israël
Congregation Toldos Yaakov Yosef of Skver
Congregation Yetev Lev Satmar
Temple Emanu-El-Beth Sholom (Reform)

Mount Royal 
Agudath Israel of Montreal, Mount Royal, Quebec
Congregation First Mesifta of Canada, Mount Royal, Quebec

La Prairie 
Communauté juive de la Rive-Sud, La Prairie, Quebec

Laval 
Centre Sépharade de Torah, Laval, Quebec
Chevra Mishnais Jacob Joseph, Laval, Quebec
Congregation Shaar Shalom, Laval, Quebec
Young Israel of Chomedey, Chomedey, Laval, Quebec

Quebec City 
Congregation Beth Israel Ohev Sholem (Quebec City)
Communauté juive de la ville de Quebec. Quebec City, Quebec

Sainte-Agathe-des-Monts 
 Congregation House of Israel, Sainte-Agathe-des-Monts, Quebec

Westmount 
Chabad of Westmount
Congregation Shaar Hashomayim
Temple Emanu-El-Beth Sholom

Saskatchewan

Edenbridge 
Beth Israel Synagogue (Edenbridge)

Regina 
Beth Jacob Synagogue
Chabad Jewish Centre of Regina

Saskatoon 
Chabad Jewish Centre of Saskatoon. Saskatoon, SK
Congregation Agudas Israel - Jewish Community Centre. Saskatoon, SK
Congregation Shir Chadash. Saskatoon, SK

See also 
List of Jewish communities in North America

References

External links
 Museum of Jewish Montreal Official Website
 Jewish Federations of Canada Official Website